A Poodle is a popular dog breed.

Poodle may also refer to:
Poodle (insult), an insult used in politics
POODLE, a computer security vulnerability
The Poodles, a Swedish heavy metal band